Giełczew  is a village in the administrative district of Gmina Piaski, within Świdnik County, Lublin Voivodeship, in eastern Poland. The village has a population of 170.

Notes

Villages in Świdnik County